Karl-Heinz Marbach (5 July 1917 – 27 September 1995) was a German officer who served in the Kriegsmarine, the navy of Nazi Germany, during World War II, and later in the West German Navy. From 1950 to 1959 he was Principal Agent of the U.S. Central Intelligence Agency-funded network with the codename LCCASSOCK, which was one of CIA's Psychological warfare efforts directed against Eastern Germany.

Awards
 Iron Cross (1939) 2nd Class (14 April 1940) & 1st Class (21 November 1943)
 Knight's Cross of the Iron Cross on 22 July 1944 as Oberleutnant zur See and commander of U-953

References

Citations

Bibliography

1917 births
1995 deaths
German Navy personnel
People from Kołobrzeg
People from the Province of Pomerania
Recipients of the Knight's Cross of the Iron Cross
U-boat commanders (Kriegsmarine)